Ornipholidotos latimargo is a butterfly in the family Lycaenidae. It is found in southern Sudan, south-western Uganda, the Democratic Republic of the Congo (the north-eastern and south-eastern parts of the country) and north-western Tanzania. The habitat consists of forests.

Adults mimic day-flying arctiid moths.

References

Butterflies described in 1933
Ornipholidotos